Richard Yates Batterton (November 5, 1905 – July 1978) was an American politician who served as the mayor of Denver, Colorado from 1959 to 1963. He is to date the last Republican to serve as Mayor of Denver.

References

Mayors of Denver
1905 births
1978 deaths
20th-century American politicians
People from Petersburg, Illinois